The 1888 Atlantic hurricane season ran through the summer and the first half of fall in 1888. In the 1888 Atlantic season there were two tropical storms, four hurricanes, and two major hurricanes. However, in the absence of modern satellite and other remote-sensing technologies, only storms that affected populated land areas or encountered ships at sea are known, so the actual total could be higher. An undercount bias of zero to six tropical cyclones per year between 1851 and 1885 and zero to four per year between 1886 and 1910 has been estimated.



Seasonal Summary

Systems

Hurricane One 

(Due to sparse observations, the system may have developed prior to this time, but was not detected.) The cyclone moved west-northwestward and quickly strengthened, becoming a hurricane late on June 16. It reached its peak intensity of  early on June 17. Around 06:00 UTC on June 17, the hurricane made landfall southwest of Bay City, Texas, over the eastern end of East Matagorda Bay. Turning to the northwest after landfall, it quickly degenerated into a tropical storm, gradually turning northward over time. By 06:00 UTC on June 18, it weakened into a tropical depression, and just 12 hours later it lost its identity near Waco, Texas.

The highest measured winds reached  in the city. Operationally, the U.S. Signal Corps—predecessor to the U.S. Weather Bureau (now the National Weather Service)—did not classify the system as an area of low pressure, and as such, it did not appear in the June 1888 track map of cyclones in the Monthly Weather Review, the official publication of the Signal Corps. However, as early as June 17 the New York Times noted that a moderate storm was apparently approaching Texas.

Tropical Storm Two 

About 16 hours later, the moderate tropical storm made landfall at that intensity just east of Bay City—impacting the same region as the previous storm. The cyclone turned north and north-northeast after striking land, slowly weakening as it did so. By 12:00 UTC on July 6, the cyclone was last positioned over northwestern Cherokee County, Texas.

Like the preceding storm, the cyclone produced heavy rain over parts of Texas, especially in the Palestine area in Anderson County.

Hurricane Three 

Detection

(Operationally, the U.S. Signal Corps did not begin tracking the system until August 16, when it was first observed off South Florida.)

Landfall and development

Moving west-northwestward, the tropical storm steadily intensified into a hurricane 24 hours later on August 15. It made landfall on Cat Island in The Bahamas, which were then a British crown colony and overseas territory. The cyclone, continuing to the west-northwest, then made another landfall on the northern end of Andros Island. About seven hours later, it made landfall just north of present-day Miami Beach at peak intensity. (This location was near present-day Upper Eastside in Miami.) The cyclone weakened as it moved inland over the Everglades, south of Lake Okeechobee, and by 06:00 UTC on August 17 passed out into the Gulf of Mexico near Matlacha and Cayo Costa. By 18:00 UTC on August 17, however, the cyclone regained intensity, and its path turned westward over the Gulf of Mexico. In the time before landfall in Louisiana, its path gradually bent to the northwest and north-northwest. Around 16:00 UTC on August 19, the cyclone made landfall south of Cocodrie, Louisiana, as the equivalence of a strong Category 2 hurricane. Turning northward after moving inland, the hurricane weakened to a strong tropical storm by 18:00 UTC on August 20, its path nearing Greenville, Mississippi, before curving to the northeast. Little more than a day later, it passed over southern New England, becoming extratropical by 12:00 UTC on August 22.

Damage caused

As it passed over The Bahamas, the hurricane caused damage to fruit trees, crops, and fences, especially on the Abaco Islands, Harbour Island, and New Providence. Winds shifted from northeast and southwest, lasting about eight hours, but damage to shipping was minimal. In South Florida, the hurricane struck a sparsely-populated section of the coast, but still produced widespread damage as far north as Sebastian. Additionally, the hurricane reportedly produced a storm surge of  "on the beaches near Miami." In the Big Bend region of Florida, winds at Cedar Key reached , accompanied by light rain, and caused several yachts to capsize. Along the Mississippi River Delta, the storm produced severe flooding. Rainfall in New Orleans totaled  over a 12-hour period, and winds in the city reached an estimated ; in the city strong winds unroofed many buildings, downed numerous trees, and blew down fences. In many areas, strong winds downed at least one-third of the timber, and damage to rice, sugarcane, corn, and cotton crops was significant. The storm produced heavy rainfall and high winds along much of its path across the Mississippi Valley, the Mid-Atlantic states, and the Northeastern United States.

Hurricane Four 

Hurricane San Gil of 1888

On August 31, a tropical storm was observed northeast of the Lesser Antilles. It moved westward, strengthening to a hurricane later that day. As it continued to strengthen, it brought heavy rain over Puerto Rico, the Turks and Caicos Islands, and Cuba. The hurricane passed Puerto Rico far off land but brought heavy rains that caused major flooding and over 100 deaths due to river flooding (similar to Hurricane Donna in 1960). On the 3rd, it reached its peak of 130 mph, but land interaction with Cuba weakened it to a minimal hurricane. It crossed the island and the Yucatán Channel, reaching the northeast coast of the Yucatán Peninsula on the 6th. After weakening to a tropical storm, it restrengthened to a Category 2 hurricane while moving southwestward in the Bay of Campeche, but it dissipated after its Veracruz landfall on the 8th. It caused 921 deaths.

Tropical Storm Five 

A tropical storm formed north of the Turks & Caicos Islands on September 6. It travelled north through the Florida Panhandle and continued northward along the east coast of the US. The storm reached Maryland before becoming extratropical on September 11. The system dissipated near Ottawa on September 13. Across the United States, the storm deposited heavy rainfall from Florida through eastern Georgia through the Carolinas into southern Virginia.

Hurricane Six 

A tropical storm formed south of Key West on September 23 and began moving northeast. It travelled parallel to the coast of Georgia, where it produced winds of  before becoming a Category 1 hurricane on September 26. It continued heading northeastward before it became extratropical on September 27 near the Gulf of St Lawrence.

Hurricane Seven 

Hurricane seven developed on October 8 in the southern Gulf of Mexico. It moved slowly northeastward and strengthened to a category 2 hurricane with 110 mph winds as it made landfall on northwestern Florida. The system then moved up the east coast, while weakening to a tropical storm. This system had a pressure of 970 millibar at one point.

Tropical Storm Eight 

Tropical storm eight formed close to the Windward Islands on November 1 and moved northward into the north Atlantic, while strengthening to 50 knots.

Hurricane Nine 

A tropical storm formed north-east of Puerto Rico on November 17. By the morning of November 23, it had developed into a Category 2 hurricane, reaching wind speeds of 100 mph (155 km/h). It maintained that level of intensity throughout the 23rd, 24th and 25 November before weakening to become extratropical on November 26. As an extratropical storm it was active until December 2.

See also 

 Atlantic hurricane season
 List of tropical cyclones

References

Bibliography

External links 
 HURDAT Data for the 1888 Atlantic hurricane season

 
Articles which contain graphical timelines
1888 natural disasters
1888 meteorology